The alveolar canals are apertures in the center of the infratemporal surface of the maxilla. The alveolar canals transmit the posterior superior alveolar vessels and nerves.

References

Foramina of the skull